Otto B. Joerns (March 13, 1864 – September 15, 1917) was an American civil engineer, businessman, and politician who served as a member of the Wisconsin State Assembly from 1910 to 1912.

Early life and education 
Born in Winooski, Wisconsin, Joerns graduated from Plymouth High School in Plymouth, Wisconsin. He received his bachelor's degree in civil engineering from Valparaiso University in 1886.

Career 
In 1905, Joerns became the owner of Joerns Furniture Company in Sheboygan, Wisconsin. He served as surveyor of Sheboygan County. Joerns also served as treasurer of the school board. He also served as assessor and mayor of Sheboygan, Wisconsin. Joerns also served on the library board and on the Sheboygan Police and Fire Commission. In 1911, Joerns served in the Wisconsin State Assembly as a Democrat.

In 1916, Joerns' furniture plant in Sheboygan was destroyed by fire. In April 1917, Joerns and his family moved to Stevens Point, Wisconsin, where the company had another furniture plant.

Death 
Joerns died suddenly in Denver, Colorado, where he had gone for medical treatment because of ill health.

Notes

1864 births
1917 deaths
People from Lyndon, Sheboygan County, Wisconsin
People from Stevens Point, Wisconsin
Valparaiso University alumni
American civil engineers
Businesspeople from Wisconsin
County officials in Wisconsin
School board members in Wisconsin
Mayors of Sheboygan, Wisconsin
19th-century American politicians
19th-century American businesspeople
Democratic Party members of the Wisconsin State Assembly